Ahačič is a Slovene surname. Notable people with the surname include:

Draga Ahačič (1924–2023), Slovene actress, film director, translator, and publicist
Vital Ahačič (1933–1995), Slovene accordionist

Slovene-language surnames